FC Sudnobudivnyk Mykolaiv was a professional Ukrainian football from Mykolaiv. The club started to compete at professional level since the 2016–17 Ukrainian Second League.

Among former presidents is Tatiana Pavlova.

Head coaches
  Dennis Lukens (1 July 2016 – 25 June 2017)
  Viktor Zhurov (25 June 2017 – 23 July 2017)
  Dennis Lukens (23 July 2017 – 2018)

League and cup history
{|class="wikitable"
|-bgcolor="#efefef"
! Season
! Div.
! Pos.
! Pl.
! W
! D
! L
! GS
! GA
! P
!Cup
!colspan=2|Europe
!Notes
|-bgcolor=SteelBlue
|align=center|2016
|align=center|4th
|align=center|4
|align=center|6 		
|align=center|0	 	 	
|align=center|2 	
|align=center|4 	 		
|align=center|3 		 	
|align=center|10 	  	
|align=center|2
|align=center|
|align=center|
|align=center|
|align=center|
|-bgcolor=PowderBlue
|align=center|2016–17
|align=center|3rd
|align=center|17
|align=center|32 	
|align=center|6 	
|align=center|4 	
|align=center|22 	
|align=center|19 	
|align=center|84 	
|align=center|22
|align=center|
|align=center|
|align=center|
|align=center|
|-bgcolor=PowderBlue
|align=center|2017–18
|align=center|3rd
|align=center|11
|align=center|33	
|align=center|5	
|align=center|4 	
|align=center|24 	
|align=center|33 	
|align=center|95 	
|align=center|19
|align=center|
|align=center|
|align=center|
|align=center|Group B
|}

See also
 FC Enerhiya Mykolaiv, a single season club from Mykolaiv
 FC Vodnyk Mykolaiv, another single season club from Mykolaiv

References

 
Football clubs in Mykolaiv
Defunct football clubs in Ukraine
Association football clubs established in 2016
2016 establishments in Ukraine
2018 disestablishments in Ukraine
Association football clubs disestablished in 2018